Cannibal! The Musical (originally known as Alferd Packer: The Musical) is a 1993 American black comedy musical film directed, written, produced, co-scored by and starring Trey Parker in his directorial debut while studying at the University of Colorado at Boulder, before reaching fame with South Park alongside his friend Matt Stone who also stars in and produced the film. It is loosely based on the true story of Alfred Packer and the sordid details of the trip from Utah to Colorado that left his five fellow travelers dead and partially eaten. Trey Parker (credited as Juan Schwartz) stars as Alferd Packer, with frequent collaborators Stone, Dian Bachar, and others playing the supporting roles.

A live staged version was performed at Sierra College, in Rocklin, California, in May 1998. It was followed by Dad's Garage Theater, Atlanta Georgia, in the fall of 1998. The Dad's Garage version is highlighted in the special features of Troma's DVD release of the movie. The show has continued to find small theaters and audiences across America and beyond for many years. In 2001, a production was staged Off-Broadway at the Kraine Theater on East 4th Street in New York.

A large-scale stage production was produced by The Rival Theatre Company at the 2008 Edinburgh Festival Fringe. It featured West End performers. It was executive produced by Jason McHugh and directed by Frazer Brown.

In 2011, producer Jason McHugh released a book titled Shpadoinkle: The Making of Cannibal! The Musical which chronicles all aspects of the creation and continuation of the Cannibal! The Musical cult phenomenon.

Plot

The film begins with a reenactment of the gruesome act of cannibalism described by the prosecuting attorney during Alferd Packer's 1883 trial. During this sensationalized account, a haggard Packer repeatedly insists that was not how it happened. During a break in the trial, Packer is enticed by journalist Polly Pry to tell his side of the story, which he proceeds to do, via flashback. He opens his tale with better times, galloping freely over green fields on his trusty horse Liane.

In 1873, Packer was part of a group of miners in Bingham Canyon, Utah who hear of new prospects in Breckenridge. Together, the small group decide to travel together into Colorado Territory to stake a claim. Packer is appointed as the replacement for the original guide, since he claimed knowledge of the area. He and Liane set off on what Packer estimates will be a three-week journey with a party of five miners: Shannon Wilson Bell, an aspiring Mormon priest; James Humphrey, who was forced by his father to join the party; Frank Miller, a cynical butcher who reluctantly joins their party at the mine; George Noon, a teenager hoping to meet women in Breckenridge; and Israel Swan, an optimist.

Four weeks later, while attempting to visit Provo for supplies they become convinced they are lost. An attempt to ask a local for directions to Provo proves unsuccessful, with the local warning them of impending doom awaiting them in the mountains. Finally arriving at a frontier post in Provo, they run into a group of three fur trappers bound for Saguache; O.D. Loutzenheiser, Preston Nutter, and their diminutive leader, Jean "Frenchy" Cabazon. The trappers despise the miners, whom they contemptuously call "diggers", yet seem to like Packer's Arabian horse, telling Packer that she's a "trapper horse". Making camp, Packer and company reveal their goals for traveling to each other in song. The next day, Packer wakes up to discover his horse and friend, Liane, is missing. After Bell wounds his leg in a bear trap, the men attempt to cross the Green River near the Utah border. They camp out for the night after their crossing, with Packer singing a heartfelt song about Liane. Eventually, after a disastrous crossing of the Colorado River the Packer party is spotted by two "Nihonjin" Indians. They are taken back to the tribe's encampment near Delta where the chief warns them of a winter storm, allowing them to wait it out with the tribe. Packer's party also find the trappers camping out with the tribe, who proceed to brag about their lives in song, but then argue over the key of said song before a small altercation breaks out over Liane, whose feedbag Packer finds in their possession.

In the present time, Packer is sentenced to death by hanging, with his execution to occur in Lake City. That night, alone, Polly muses over the case and Packer's testimony, and she reveals her growing affection for him through song. The next day, Polly visits Packer once again in prison, where he continues his story.

The men set out in the wilderness and begin to suspect that Packer is really only interested in following the trappers to find his horse, and Bell's temper begins to shorten as his wound from the bear trap becomes infected and develops gangrene. They encounter a foreboding "Cyclops", a tall mountain man with a wounded, pus-spurting eye, while unwittingly trying to steal one of his sheep for sustenance. Later, the badly frostbitten Swan tries to cheer everybody up with a song about building a snowman, only for Miller to destroy Swan's snowman with a pickaxe. They soon run out of food, resorting to eating their shoes as they become lost in the snow-covered Rocky Mountains. Out of frustration, Bell shoots Swan in the head while in the middle of a song, because he does not appreciate his (Swan's) Pollyanna-esque perspective on their predicament. The men discuss their dire situation that night over the fire, speaking of the cannibalism that the Donner Party had to resort to in California. They decide to consume the body of their dead companion as Miller cuts up Swan's body, and only Bell refuses to partake in the cannibalism. Packer then has a ballet-inspired nightmare involving himself, Liane, and Cabazon. After a few more days, the party loses hope, which leads to talk of sacrificing one of their own. Packer convinces them for one more chance for a scouting trip, but when he returns, Bell has killed the others, claiming they planned to kill and eat him after Packer left. Packer is forced to throw a cleaver at Bell, seemingly killing him, after threatening to turn him in, realizing he has gone insane. He is then forced to cannibalize the others to wait out the rest of the winter.

Arriving in Saguache sometime later, Packer finds Liane, who has taken to Cabazon, upsetting Packer. The sheriff of Saguache, suspicious of Packer arriving without the rest of his party, eventually finds out the fate of the other members and attempts to arrest Packer for cannibalism at a saloon. A bar-fight between Packer and the trappers occurs, which Packer wins after brutally attacking Cabazon's groin using fighting techniques he learned from the Nihonjin chief, leaving Cabazon incapacitated with a high-pitched voice. Following this, Packer attempts to flee to Wyoming, only to later be arrested there and brought back to Colorado to await judgment. On the day of Packer's execution in Lake City, the town breaks into song, celebrating Packer's impending death. However, he is saved at the last minute by Polly, who arrives on the scene with Liane. Polly reveals that Packer had gotten a stay of execution from the governor stating that he could not be convicted of a state crime since Colorado was not a state at the time of the incident. Meanwhile, Cabazon, whose voice is still high pitched and wants revenge against Packer for their fight in Saguache, states the townsfolk came to see bloodshed and tries to trigger the gallows. The Nihonjin chief saves Packer by cutting his rope with a katana before beheading Cabazon, satisfying the crowd's blood-lust. Packer, seeing that Polly brought back Liane, realizes he does not need her anymore and chooses Polly (much to the excitement of the chief, who takes off after Liane with his katana), and the two kiss, only to be frightened by a still-alive but badly maimed Bell.

Cast
 Trey Parker as Alferd Packer (credited as Juan Schwartz)
 Toddy Walters as Polly Pry
 Matt Stone as James Humphrey (credited as Mathew Stone)
 Dian Bachar as George "California" Noon
 Jason McHugh as Frank Miller
 Jon Hegel as Israel Swan
 Ian Hardin as Shannon Wilson Bell
 Duster as Packer's horse, Liane
 Robert Muratore as Jean "Frenchy" Cabazon
 Edward Henwood as O.D. Loutzenheiser/The Cyclops
 Andrew Kemler as Preston Nutter
 Masao Maki as the Chief of the fictitious Nihonjin Indian tribe (credited as Maseo Maki)
 Japanese foreign exchange students as Nihonjin Indians
 Junichi as Junichi
 Tomomi as Tomomi, a young Indian girl whom Noon swoons over
 Audrey Stafferd as the Voice of Doom
 Randy Parker (Trey Parker's father) as Judge Jerry
 Jessica James Kelly as Tiny Tim/Baby Packer
 Martin Leeper as the Sheriff of Saguache (credited as Marty Leeper)
 Brad Gordon as Mills
 Steve Jackson as the Sheriff of Lake City
 Stan Brakhage as Noon's father
 Don Yannacito as Humphrey's father
 Kevin Allen as a passerby who glances over Polly Pry with a confused look as she performs "This Side of Me"
 Liane Adamo as one of the dancers during the "Hang the Bastard" number (uncredited)
 Chris Graves as a drunken man who plays a cowbell break in "Hang the Bastard" (uncredited)
 Joe McHugh (Jason McHugh's father) as General Store Clerk (uncredited)
 Brody McHugh (Jason McHugh's sister) as Woman leaving store (uncredited)

Cast notes

Musical numbers
 "Shpadoinkle" – Alferd
 "Shpadoinkle (Reprise)" – George, Alferd, Shannon, Frank, Swan, and Humphrey
 "That's All I'm Asking for" – George, Alferd, Shannon, Frank, Swan, and Humphrey.
 "When I Was on Top of You" – Alferd
 "Trapper Song" – Frenchy (voice of Parker), Loutzenheiser, and Nutter
 "This Side of Me" – Polly
 "Let's Build a Snowman" – Swan
 "Let's Build a Snowman (Reprise)" – Swan
 "That's All I'm Asking for (Reprise)" – George, Alferd, Shannon, Frank and Humphrey
 "Hang the Bastard" – Company
 "Shpadoinkle (Finale)" – Polly, Alferd, and Company

Contrasting with the musical's generally dark and morbid humor are its cheerful songs, all composed by Parker, including "Let's Build a Snowman", "When I Was on Top of You", "Hang the Bastard", and "Shpadoinkle" (pronounced shpah-doink-ul). The last of these is a transparent parody of the song "Oh, What a Beautiful Mornin'" from the Rodgers & Hammerstein musical Oklahoma!.

Two songs that were originally going to be in the film, but later taken out, were "Shatterproof", a rap song to be sung by Packer during the bar fight scene, and "Don't Be Stupid", a song to be sung by some of the Bingham Canyon miners after the reprise of "Shpadoinkle". An interview with Ian Hardin (now known as Ian Keldin) revealed that Trey thought "Shatterproof" made Packer seem too tough.

Production

The film began as a 3-minute trailer made for a film class, having been an idea Parker and his friends had for a while but also inspired in part by Parker's resentment towards his ex-fiancée Lianne Adamo after discovering her cheating on him not long before their wedding, with Packer's disloyal horse "Liane" in the final film being based on her. After the trailer drew much attention, Parker and Stone raised around $125,000 and began shooting the full-length film. The film was shot during weekends and on spring break in 1993, and according to Ian Hardin, most of the crew failed their film history class as a result. Filming was done on location throughout Colorado in Denver, Colorado National Monument, Black Canyon, and Ouray, with the courtroom scenes being shot in the actual courthouse that Alferd Packer was tried in, in Lake City, and the town scenes taking place in Provo, Saguache, and the hanging scene being shot in different parts of the Buckskin Joe Old West theme park in Canyon City.

A few incidents happened during filming, such as Parker getting a hairline hip fracture after being thrown from one of the horses playing "Liane", fights occasionally breaking out among the crew, some of the main cast experiencing cold shock and almost being swept away by strong currents from crossing the icy Gunnison River that doubled for the Green River, as well as inclement weather and even an avalanche complicating shooting.

This film was originally titled Alferd Packer: The Musical in 1993. The film premiered on October 31, 1993, in Boulder, Colorado, at a cinema near the University of Colorado campus. A fake protest organized by friends of Parker and Stone, organized along the lines of an animal rights demonstration, took place in front of the theater. The film then played at Raindance Film Festival in October 2004. Parker and Stone attended.

It was not released generally until 1996, however, when Troma Entertainment picked it up and renamed it Cannibal! The Musical out of concern that not enough people outside of Colorado knew who Packer was. Few people outside of Colorado ever saw the film since Troma did not distribute it widely. Parker and Stone's animated satire South Park debuted the following year.

Several live productions of the show have been mounted, with excerpts from one live version available on the DVD.

Home media
Following Matt and Trey's success with South Park, Troma re-released the film on VHS and DVD and it enjoyed a decent cult following. The DVD contains a "Drunken Director's Commentary" where Parker and Stone along with most of the cast get drunk as they watch the film, although there are a few times when the commentary cuts out.

The film has since been released on UMD for the Sony PSP. A special edition 13th anniversary DVD was released by Troma with added features, including all-new interviews with the cast and crew.

The film was re-released in November 2008 as the first of the "Tromasterpiece Collection," as Troma considers Cannibal! to be one of its best films. Included in the new two-disc version, with over three hours of special features, never-before-seen deleted material and stage shows. Songs such as "Shatter Proof" and the early short films of Parker and Stone were considered to be a part of the new DVD, but these additions were ultimately rejected.

Stage productions
There have been several amateur productions of Cannibal! The Musical since 1996. The first was at the Sierra College in Northern California and then at Dad's Garage Theater where it won accolades by fans and the press.

In 2001, Saturday Players launched a six-month off-off-Broadway run of the show that earned critical acclaim and returning audience members.

In 2004, Cannibal made its European debut in Rome at the Teatro di Servi.

In 2005, the first High School group attempted the show at The Ironwood Ridge High School in Tucson, Arizona, but the show was censored by the school and performed off campus as a benefit. Later that year the show made its German debut at the University of Regensburg and played many small colleges and community houses in the US.

In 2006, the show debuted at its first Fringe Festivals in Minneapolis and Victoria, Canada and continued to find adoption by small colleges and community theaters.

In 2008, The Insurgo Theater Movement launched the show in Las Vegas for the first of several runs by their company. Unexpected Productions launched the first of four October runs of Cannibal in Seattle.

Also in 2008, The Rival Theatre Company produced the first large-scale professional production. The show ran from July 31 to August 25 at the George Square Theatre, Edinburgh for a total of 26 performances. It starred Aimie Atkinson as Polly Pry and James Topping as Alferd Packer. Original film cast member Jason McHugh made a guest appearance as Mr. Mills. Other guest stars included Jim Bowen and The Q Brothers.

This production was planned a six-week run to the West End from July 27, 2010, at the Leicester Square Theatre. However, after copyright holder Jason McHugh withdrew the rights in May 2010, the show was canceled.

In 2011, M.P.M.M. Productions, performed the musical in Winnipeg, Manitoba, Canada during the 2011 Winnipeg Fringe Festival. It won "The Best of Fest" for its venue (meaning it outsold other shows in the venue and was awarded an additional show). The show also debuted in St Louis and Denver with great reviews and enthusiastic casts and audience members.

In May 2012, Logan Donahoo Presents performed a version of the musical in Orlando, Florida during the 2012 Orlando International Fringe Theatre Festival, in the Yellow venue. The show was successful, receiving positive reviews, and winning Patron's Pick for its venue, meaning that it had outsold all of the other shows and was awarded an additional performance.

Trey Parker's Cannibal! The Musical played in Toronto at David Mirvish's Panasonic Theatre for a four-week run (February 10 to March 8, 2015). Additional book, lyrics, and music by Christopher Bond, Aaron Eyre, and Trevor Martin.

It was announced in early 2014 that a production of the show is being produced at the Waterfront Theatre in Vancouver, B.C. by independent traveling theatre troupe Last Chance Productions. The show ran from June 12, 2014, until March 8, 2015, with two separate seating areas (a "Gore Zone" where audience members are subject to splash-zone-esque involvement, and a less messy "Gore-Free Zone".)

In 2019, Cannibal the Musical had its Bay Area premiere. It was performed by The Other Other Theatre Company in San Francisco. The show ran from July 21–29 at MoonSpace.

Reception

Cannibal! currently holds a 63% "Fresh" approval rating on Rotten Tomatoes based on 19 reviews, with a weighted average of 5.2/10. The site's critical consensus says: "If you're only going to watch one black comedy about a real-life explorer whose fellow travelers ended up eaten, make it Cannibal! The Musical."

See also
 Ravenous, a similar film about Packer and the Donner Party
 "Helen Keller! The Musical", an episode of South Park
 The Book of Mormon, a Tony Award-winning Broadway musical about The Book of Mormon by Stone, Parker, and Robert Lopez
 Poultrygeist: Night of the Chicken Dead, a 2006 film directed by Lloyd Kaufman
 BASEketball, a 1998 sports comedy film
 South Park: Bigger, Longer & Uncut, a 1999 adult animated black-comedy musical film
 Team America: World Police, a 2004 adult puppet film

References

External links
 
 
 
 UK Production

1993 films
1993 comedy films
1993 directorial debut films
1990s black comedy films
1990s historical comedy films
1990s musical comedy films
1990s Western (genre) comedy films
American black comedy films
American films based on actual events
American independent films
American musical comedy films
American Western (genre) comedy films
Works about Alferd Packer
Films about cannibalism
Films based on classical mythology
Films directed by Trey Parker
Films set in Colorado
Films set in the 1870s
Films set in the 1880s
1990s Japanese-language films
Mormonism in fiction
Songs about cannibalism
American student films
Troma Entertainment films
Works by Trey Parker and Matt Stone
Films with screenplays by Trey Parker
Films produced by Trey Parker
Films scored by Trey Parker
Films produced by Matt Stone
1990s English-language films
1990s American films